Frank Hailwood (3 April 1873 – 21 May 1944) was an Australian rules footballer who played for the Collingwood Football Club in the Victorian Football League (VFL).

Family

One of the eight children of Joseph Hailwood (1834–1912), and Ellen Hailwood (1839-1916), née Connor, Francis Hailwood was born at Alexandra, Victoria on 3 April 1873.

His brother, John Hailwood (1870-1917), was killed in action while serving with the First AIF in Belgium on 4 October 1917.

Football

Collingwood (VFA)
Recruited from Collingwood Juniors.

Collingwood (VFL)
Hailwood was Collingwood's ruckman during seven seasons in eight years for Collingwood in the VFL. Hailwood played 150 games for Collingwood, including the 1902 Grand Final win over Essendon.

"Old Boy's" Champion Player of 1899
At the end of the 1899 season, in the process of naming his own "champion player", the football correspondent for The Argus ("Old Boy"), selected a team of the best players of the 1899 VFL competition:
 Backs: Maurie Collins (Essendon), Bill Proudfoot (Collingwood), Peter Burns (Geelong)
 Halfbacks: Pat Hickey (Fitzroy), George Davidson (South Melbourne), Alf Wood (Melbourne)
  Centres: Fred Leach (Collingwood), Firth McCallum (Geelong), Harry Wright (Essendon)
 Wings: Charlie Pannam (Collingwood), Eddie Drohan (Fitzroy), Herb Howson (South Melbourne)
 Forwards: Bill Jackson (Essendon), Eddy James (Geelong), Charlie Colgan (South Melbourne)
 Ruck: Mick Pleass (South Melbourne), Frank Hailwood (Collingwood), Joe McShane (Geelong)
 Rovers: Dick Condon (Collingwood), Bill McSpeerin (Fitzroy), Teddy Rankin (Geelong).

From those he considered to be the three best players — that is, Condon, Hickey, and Pleass — "Old Boy" selected Pat Hickey as his "champion player" of the season.

Boulder City (GFA)
On 22 April 1903 he was cleared from Collingwood to the Boulder City Football Club in the West Australian Goldfields Football Association (GFA).

Collingwood (VFL)
Although he was cleared from Collingwood Football Club to the Collingwood Juniors in July 1904, he was reinstated in the senior team, playing in the last four of the last five home-and-away matches of the 1904 season, and in the 10 September 1904 Semi-Final team that lost to Fitzroy 7.8 (50) to 9.7 (61).

Subiaco (WAFA)
On 30 May 1906 he was cleared from Collingwood to the Subiaco Football Club in the West Australian Football Association (WAFA).

Death
He died at his residence in Carlton, Victoria on 21 May 1944.

Notes

References
 Holmesby, Russell & Main, Jim (2014), The Encyclopedia of AFL Footballers: every AFL/VFL player since 1897 (10th ed.), Melbourne, Victoria: Bas Publishing.

External links

 
 Frank "Charger" Hailwood playing statistics from WAFL Footy Facts.
 
 Frank Hailwood, at Collingwood Forever.

1873 births
1944 deaths
Australian rules footballers from Victoria (Australia)
Australian Rules footballers: place kick exponents
Collingwood Football Club (VFA) players
Collingwood Football Club players
Boulder City Football Club players
Subiaco Football Club players
Collingwood Football Club Premiership players
One-time VFL/AFL Premiership players